Połczyn-Zdrój  (formerly ) is a town in Świdwin County, West Pomeranian Voivodeship, Poland, with 11,153 inhabitants (2007). It is located in the historic region of Pomerania.

History 
Połczyn-Zdrój dates back to an early medieval Pomeranian settlement. The town and its castle are mentioned in historical records from 1321 and 1331, respectively, which state that they belonged to a fief that the powerful noble family of Wedell had obtained from the Pomeranian dukes. In the 15th century other families  were in possession of the town. In 1905 the town had a population of 5,046 which in the year of 1925 had grown to 5,960 persons.

Before World War I, the town was known as Polzin. It acquired the name Bad Polzin (i. e., "Bath Polzin", or "Polzin Spa") between the two World Wars.During World War II the Germans established a camp for Polish children intended for Germanisation. In March 1945 the region was occupied by the Red Army, and after the end of the war it became part of Poland. The town's first post-war mayor was Benedykt Polak, former prisoner of the Oflag II-C German prisoner-of-war camp. In July 1996, after heavy rainfall, the town suffered a flood, after which a new retention reservoir was built between 2000 and 2003.

Gallery

Notable residents
 Anton von Krockow (1714–1778) a Prussian lieutenant general. 
 Karl Schröder (1884–1950) a German communist politician and writer
 Friedl Behn-Grund (1906–1989) a German cinematographer 
 Volker Vogeler (1930–2005) a German film director and screenwriter 
 Bernd Heinrich (born 1940) a biologist and long distance runner
 Susan Denberg (born 1944) a German-Austrian model and actress 
 Rosemarie Zens (born 1944) a German writer and photographer
 Robert Atzorn (born 1945) a German television actor 
 Stanisław Wziątek (born 1959) a Polish politician, elected to Sejm in 2005 
 Janusz Janowski (born 1965) a Polish painter, jazz drummer and art theorist
 Olgierd Moskalewicz (born 1974) a Polish footballer, over 420 pro appearances
 Sławomir Nitras (born 1973) a Polish politician and political scientist, elected to the Sejm in 2015.
 Piotr Kosiorowski (born 1981), Polish footballer, over 200 pro appearances
 Szymon Pawłowski (born 1986), Polish footballer, over 275 pro appearances and 17 for Poland
 Joanna Zachoszcz (born 1993) a Polish swimmer, competed in the women's 10 km at the 2016 Summer Olympics

References

External links
 Official town webpage

Cities and towns in West Pomeranian Voivodeship
Polczyn Zdroj
Spa towns in Poland